Víctor Tantalean (born 27 November 1933) is a Peruvian former sports shooter. He competed in the 25 metre pistol event at the 1968 Summer Olympics.

References

1933 births
Living people
Peruvian male sport shooters
Olympic shooters of Peru
Shooters at the 1968 Summer Olympics